Two Sisters was launched in 1797 in Nova Scotia and in 1804 shifted her registry to the United Kingdom. A French privateer captured her in 1804 but two members of her crew (a man and a boy) were able to take control of her after the prize crew abandoned her. They were able to reach an English port after almost three weeks. Two Sisters became a coaster and was last listed in 1813.

Career
Two Sisters first appeared in Lloyd's Register in 1804.

Lloyd's List (LL) reported in September 1804 that the French privateer Uncle Thomas had captured at  two vessels, Mary, of Greenock, which had been sailing to Virginia, and Two Sisters, of Dartmouth, which had been sailing from Newfoundland. Polly brought into Penzance on 3 September 11 crew from the vessels.

The French prize master sailed Two Sisters for Ushant. As she approached the port the French prize crew sighted some sails that they thought might be British naval vessels, and took to her boats, abandoning her, and her mate and a boy who had been part of the original crew and whom the French had kept onboard. The two had no compass, quadrant, or the like, and few provisions. The two were at sea for some 20 days before they succeeded in reaching Ilfracombe. LL reported that Two Sisters had been taken, retaken, and had come into Ilfracombe.

The entry in LR carried the notation "captured", but struck through.

Fate
Two Sisters was last listed in 1813.

Notes

Citations

1790s ships
Ships built in Nova Scotia
Age of Sail merchant ships of England
Captured ships